Malohat Badriddinovna Shahobova (March 15, 1928 – 2005) was a Tajikistani linguist.

Born in Bukhara, Shahobova took a degree in English, graduating from the Institute of Foreign Languages in 1948. Three years later, she graduated from Dushanbe Pedagogical Institute. In 1959, she graduated from the Institute of Foreign Languages in Moscow. Becoming an academic, she then began teaching at both the Institute of Foreign Languages and the Dushanbe Pedagogical Institute. She became a member of the Communist Party of the Soviet Union in 1952. She received a doctorate in 1985, and achieved the rank of professor two years later. Shahobova's work focused on the relationships between Tajik and English. Her publications include The English Language (1982); Experimental Comparative Study of Tajiki and English Grammars (Moscow, 1985); An English-Tajik Dictionary (1987); and Tajik-Russian Conversation (1993). She also produced a study of the work of Indian writers. Even in retirement, she remained active at the Tajikistan Academy of Sciences, in whose Department of Foreign Languages she continued to work. She was also the founder of the Women's Association of Tajikistan, and led the organization for many years. For her work, she was awarded the Honorary Order of the Presidium of the Supreme Soviet of Tajikistan.

References

1928 births
2005 deaths
Linguists from Tajikistan
People from Bukhara
20th-century linguists
20th-century women writers
Communist Party of the Soviet Union members
Members of the Tajik Academy of Sciences